Ray Lyell (born 1962 in Hamilton, Ontario) is a Canadian singer, songwriter, and vocal coach.

Career
Ray Lyell came to prominence with his band, the Storm, in the late 1980s. Ray Lyell and the Storm released their self-titled debut album in 1989. Its first single, "Another Man's Gun", scored No. 6 on the AOR charts. The second single released by Lyell, "Carry Me", was a top 40 hit on the CHR charts and still gets airplay in Canada. Lyell was nominated for a Juno Award as Most Promising Male Vocalist, in 1989. Shortly after the nomination, he began an international tour in Australia.

In 1992, Lyell sold the rights to the name "the Storm" after a legal conflict in the United States. Desert Winds, his next album, was released under his own name, even though the members of the band continued to tour and perform with him. "Gypsy Wind" was the album's first successful single. In 1994, Ray Lyell travelled to Nashville, Tennessee, to begin working on his third album, Working Man, with writers, Billy Crain and Todd Cerney. Working Man was released in 1995. A decade later, Lyell released his fourth album, Running on Faith, with CMC Canada.

Vocal coach
In 1996, Lyell developed the Dynamic System of Vocal Teaching. His experience as a performer, with thousands of shows, meshed  with his ability to coach singers toward better and healthier vocal performances.

In an effort to expand his own knowledge, Lyell has studied with some of the most prominent vocal coaches in North America. He continues to teach, write and record out of his studio, Rayne Records, in Hamilton, Ontario, Canada.

Songwriter
In 1987, radio station HTZ-FM sponsored a songwriting contest.  Ray Lyell won first place with his song, "Take This Heart".

Later that year, he co-wrote, with Paul Hackman of the band Helix, the title track to their album, Wild In The Streets.  The success of Wild In The Streets earned Lyell a gold album.  He also co-wrote tracks on half-ALIVE and It's a Business Doing Pleasure with Hackman.

Lyell wrote all of the songs from his four albums, with an occasional collaboration with other writers such as Billy Crain.

Discography

Albums

Singles

References

External links
 Official site

1962 births
Living people
Canadian male singers
Canadian songwriters
Musicians from Hamilton, Ontario
Vocal coaches
Writers from Hamilton, Ontario
Date of birth missing (living people)